U.S. Route 83 (US-83) is a part of the U.S. Highway System that runs from the Veterans International Bridge in Brownsville, Texas north to the Canadian border, north of Westhope, North Dakota, where it continues as Manitoba Highway 83. In the U.S. state of Kansas, US-83 is a main north–south highway that runs from the Oklahoma border north to the Nebraska border.

In 1926, the highway that first became known as US-83 was established as K-22. Then between 1930 and 1931, US-83 was extended into Kansas along K-22, which was decommissioned. Then between 1941 and 1944, US-83 and US-183 were swapped within Nebraska and a small portion into Kansas. US-83 was changed to turn north just northeast of Selden and the former alignment of US-83 from northeast of Selden to US-183 east of Woodruff became US-383, now K-383.

Route description
From here it continues north to Liberal where it intersects US-54 and US-270 ends. North of Liberal, US-83 begins a concurrency with US-160, and the highways remain joined until reaching Sublette, the seat of Haskell County. US-83 and US-160 split north of Sublette; US-160 heads west toward Ulysses, and US-83 continues north toward Garden City.

At Garden City, US-50 and US-400 join US-83 for a brief concurrency on a bypass around the east and north sides of the city while US-83 Business follows the former routing through downtown. All three routes cross K-156, also known as Kansas Avenue, in the northwest portion of the city. At the north end of the US-50/US-83 Business route, US-83 splits and heads north toward Scott City, while US-50 and US-400 remain joined through the rest of the state. The highway passes through largely unpopulated areas of Finney County and Scott County before reaching a junction with K-96 in downtown Scott City.

In northern Scott County, K-4 has its origins at US-83, heading east toward Healy, and US-83 traverses through rolling farmlands until reaching Oakley, the seat of Logan County. US-83 reaches US-40 less than a mile west of I-70, and the two highways jog west for a brief multiplex before US-83 splits and crosses I-70.

North of I-70, US-83 intersects US-24 then curves northeast, east of Gem in Thomas County. US-83 continues its northeasterly track through Rexford and Selden. After passing through Selden, US-83 intersects the southern terminus of K-383 and the northern terminus of K-23. From here, US-83 turns north, crosses into Decatur County then continues north and intersects US-36 in Oberlin. Oberlin is the last area of significant population the highway passes in Kansas; the next city is McCook, Nebraska.

History

In 1926, the highway that first became known as US-83 was established as K-22. Then between 1930 and 1931, US-83 was extended into Kansas along K-22, which was decommissioned. Between July 1938 and 1939, US-183 was altered to follow US-36 east to K-1 in Phillipsburg, which created a short overlap between US-83 and US-183 near Norton. Then between 1941 and 1944, US-183 and US-83 were swapped within Nebraska and a small portion into Kansas. US-83 was changed to turn north just northeast of Selden and US-183 was changed to  continue north past Phillipsburg, which eliminated the overlap between the two in Norton. The former alignment of US-83 from northeast of Selden to east of Woodruff became US-383, now K-383.

In a July 2010 study, US-83 was planned to be reconstructed from Sublette to Scott City and included a diamond interchange to be built at the K-144 intersection. In February 2016, KDOT accepted a bid of $22.3 million (equivalent to $ in ) to convert the junction with K-144 to a diamond interchange as well as reconstruct a  section of US-83. On June 26, 2017, K-144 was closed and on June 27, 2017, US-160 was closed from K-190 east to US-83 and K-144. On September 20, 2017, US-160 and K-144 reopened, with only minor work remaining to complete the entire project.

Major intersections

Business route

U.S. Route 83 Business (US-83 Bus.) is a business route in Garden City.

References

External links

Kansas Department of Transportation State Map
KDOT: Historic State Maps

 Kansas
83
Transportation in Seward County, Kansas
Transportation in Haskell County, Kansas
Transportation in Finney County, Kansas
Transportation in Scott County, Kansas
Transportation in Logan County, Kansas
Transportation in Thomas County, Kansas
Transportation in Sheridan County, Kansas
Transportation in Decatur County, Kansas